Portrait of a Lady is a 1677 oil painting on canvas by Nicolaes Maes, created in 1677. It is held at the Timken Museum of Art, in San Diego.

References

1677 paintings
Paintings by Nicolaes Maes
Paintings in the collection of the Timken Museum of Art
Paintings of people